An apostolic executor is a cleric who is charged with putting into practice a Papal rescript.

References

Christian religious occupations